The 2010-11 season was the Carabins second season in the Canadian Interuniversity Sport women's ice hockey championship (CIS). The Carabins ranked in second place in the Quebecois conference behind the McGill Martlets. In the 2011 playoffs, the Carabins eliminated the Concordia Stingers but the Carabins are in turn to eliminate in finale by McGill. The Carabins were unable to qualify for the 2011 CIS Canadian championships.

Regular season

Roster

Staff
 General manager Danièle Sauvageau
 Councillor-Adviser France St-Louis
 Head Coach: Isabelle Leclaire
 Assistant Coach: Brittany Privée
 Assistant Coach: Pascal Daoust
 Goalkeeper Coach: Patrick Larivière

Awards and honors
Forwards Josianne Legault, Kim Deschênes, defenders Stéphanie Daneau, Janique Duval and goaltender Rachel Ouellette were named to the All-Star teams of the league.
In the gold medal game of the 2011 Winter Universiade, Kim Deschênes scored one of four goals for Canada as they claimed the gold medal.

See also
2009–10 Montreal Carabins women's ice hockey season
Montreal Carabins women's ice hockey
Montreal Carabins
Canadian Interuniversity Sport women's ice hockey championship

References

External links
 Official Website of Montreal Carabins women's ice hockey

Montreal Carabins women's ice hockey season, 2010-11
Montreal
Carabins